James Henry Apperley Tremenheere (30 October 1853 – 28 October 1912) was an Indian-born English colonial official and cricketer. His report recommended that the British government should allot lands for the Scheduled Castes to overcome the social discrimination they faced. These lands were later identified as Depressed Class condition lands (பஞ்சமி நிலம்).

Life
He was the son of Charles William Tremenheere. He was born in Poona, and educated in England at Lancing College, where he played cricket for the school.

He passed the entry examination for the Indian Civil Service in 1873, and completed his training in 1875. He arrived in India in November 1875, and worked first in Madras. He was moved to Mysore in 1883, but was later returned to Madras.

In 1891 Tremenheere was Collector for Chingleput, and reported on the depressed castes, at a time of local famine. He described the poor condition of a group of Paraiyars at Senneri. He suggested improving their position with respect to land ownership. He took into account the report of his predecessor, Lee Warner, and attributed the social problem he met to the mirasi system. The report's conclusions, however, were resisted by the Board of Revenue. Tremenheere became Collector and magistrate at Kistna in 1894. He was appointed Collector for the Niligris in 1896.

Tremenheere retired in 1901. He died in Scotland, at Inglismaldie Castle in Edzell and was buried in Brookwood Cemetery in Surrey.

Cricket

J.H.A. Tremenheere was a right-handed batsman and a right-arm round-arm medium pace bowler who played for Gloucestershire. He made a single first-class appearance, during the 1872 season, aged just 18, against Surrey. From the lower order, he scored 7 runs in the only innings in which he batted, as his team secured a win by an innings margin.

Works

The Lesbia of Catullus (1897), translator

Family
Tremenheere married Jessie Retallack van Anken.

Notes

1853 births
1912 deaths
English cricketers
Gloucestershire cricketers
Indian Civil Service (British India) officers
Burials at Brookwood Cemetery